Negin Shiraghaei Kootenaei (born September 1981) is an Iranian activist, entrepreneur and a former news presenter and reporter for the BBC World Service's Persian service based in London. She spoke at United Nations Human Rights Council twice and campaigned on women's rights.

Career 
Kootenaei co-founded March Health , an AI-powered women's health solution that eases physical and psychological menstrual discomfort. 

After leaving the BBC she founded Open Growth UK, a communication company with the aim to elevate purpose-driven individuals and start-ups which she closed after joining March Health.

She has been campaigning against systematic harassment of female journalists.  She is also a director of Coding for Girls Limited.

In November 2017 it was reported in The Times that the Iranian authorities had tried to influence her reporting through the intimidation of her family in Iran. She talked about her experience at the BBC in an interview including the harassment of her family.

Before joining the BBC in January 2009, she worked as a journalist for the Iranian news outlets, Hamshahri Newspaper, Shargh Newspaper, Etemaad Newspaper, the Cultural Heritage News Agency and ISNA News Agency.

References

External links 
https://twitter.com/neginsh?lang=en

Living people
1981 births
Iranian television presenters
BBC people
Iranian women journalists
Iranian emigrants to the United Kingdom
Iranian women television presenters